Saraya al-Jihad ("Jihad Companies") or as the Popular Mobilization Forces' 17th Brigade is an Iraqi Shia group and the armed wing of the Jihad and Development Movement, operating in Iraq and Syria under the command of the Popular Mobilization Forces. It has been closely intertwined with Liwa al-Muntazar.

See also 
 List of armed groups in the Iraqi Civil War
 List of armed groups in the Syrian Civil War

References

External links 
 

Popular Mobilization Forces
Shia Islamist groups
Arab militant groups
Anti-ISIL factions in Iraq
Anti-ISIL factions in Syria
Pro-government factions of the Syrian civil war
Jihadist groups in Iraq
Jihadist groups in Syria